Valtion lentokonetehdas (State aircraft factory) was a Finnish aircraft manufacturing company that was founded on 23 February 1928 from the IVL or I.V.L. factory (Ilmailuvoimien lentokonetehdas, Finnish Air Force Aircraft Factory), founded in 1921.

The company was transferred from being subordinate to the Finnish Air Force to being subordinate to the Ministry of Defence. The company, and its products were named with the prefix VL.

Island factory 

The company began its production at Suomenlinna and Santahamina in Helsinki. The factory did not have an airport, only the sea and sea ice could be used for take-off and landing. Most of the aircraft built in Helsinki were seaplanes. In Helsinki the aircraft built were small compared to the Bristol Blenheim bombers built under licence in the late 1930s. Much of the final assembly was done outdoors. The company was looking for a new production facility further away from the Soviet Union. Helsinki was seen as a bad location for an armaments factory from a strategic viewpoint.

Expansion to Tampere 

In 1936 the factory was moved to Härmälä, near Tampere, which was also a potential bombing target since it was the biggest industrial city in Finland. The build up of the factory and the airport around it gave work to hundreds of people in the depression of the 1930s. Politically Tampere was in the left which almost led to the factory being located to Vaasa.

During the Second World War, the VL serviced and assembled German (Junkers Ju 88) and British (Bristol Blenheim) bomber aircraft. The Tampere factory employed 665 persons in 1936 and 1,697 persons by 1941. A major part of the work of the factory was overhaul and repair of military aircraft, building new aircraft was a secondary function and the design of indigenous aircraft a tertiary function.

During the wars, the production was dispersed all over Finland to avoid destruction of the whole factory at once; the engine factory was moved to Kokkola, the woodworking factory to Kylmäkoski, stores to Viiala and Pirkkala. Other facilities were located at Pori and Kolho. The Karhumäki brothers' factory was entirely transferred under VL's supervision at the end of the war.

Part of Valmet after WWII 

After World War II, the Finnish state consolidated its industrial assets, and VL was integrated as part of Valtion Metallitehtaat (VMT, State Metal Works), later 'Valmet'. The ownership of the factory was moved to the ministry of trade and industry.

With the ending of World War II in 1945, the Valtion Lentokonetehdas and other state owned factories were merged into the company Valtion Metallitehtaat Lentokonetehdas (State Metal Factories, often abbreviated to V.M.T. or VMT). This company did not only focus on aircraft but on anything from general household machinery to engines.

The Finnish aircraft design declined for several years and it was not until 1951 when a new design was flown. That same year Valtion Metallitehtaat Lentokonetehdas was renamed Valmet OY Lentokonetehdas (Valmet Aircraft Factory) with its subsidiaries named Valmet Oy Tampereen tehdas ja Kuoreveden tehdas (Valmet Oy Tampere works and Kuorevesi works). The company has been renamed many times since the 1960s. In 1963 Karhumäki works at Kuorevesi became part of Valmet. Its main business was maintenance work for the Ilmavoimat (Finnish AF). In 1967 Valmet moved all its aviation activities to Kuorevesi. In 1974 Valmet OY Lentokonetehdas was renamed Valmet Lentokonetehtaat (Valmet Aviation Industries), and in 1989 Valmet Lentokonetehdas was renamed into Valmet Lentokoneteollisuus (Valmet Aircraft Industries). On September 5, 1996, Valmet became Patria Finavitec Oy.

Aircraft

Ilmailuvoimien Lentokonetehdas 

 IVL A.22 Hansa (Hansa-Brandenburg W.33)
 IVL C.24
 IVL C.25
 Caudron C.60

 IVL D.26 Haukka I
 IVL K.1 Kurki

Valtion Lentokonetehdas 

 VL D.27 Haukka II
 VL Sääski (Mosquito)
 Koolhoven FK.31
 VL E.30 Kotka
 VL F.30 Paarma
 Letov Š-218 Smolik
 VL Tuisku
 VL Viima
 VL Pyry
 VL Myrsky
 VL Humu

 VL Pyörremyrsky
licence built
 Blackburn Ripon
 Bristol Blenheim
 de Havilland Moth
 Fokker C.X
 Fokker D.XXI
 Gloster Gamecock

Valmet 

 Valmet Vihuri
 Valmet Tuuli
 Fouga CM 170R Magister
 Valmet L-70 Miltrainer Vinka
 BAE Hawk
 Valmet L-80 Turbo-Vinha
 Valmet PIK-23 Towmaster
 Valmet L-90TP Redigo
licence built
 Saab 35 Draken
 BAE Hawk
 F-18C Hornet

References 

Valmet
Aircraft manufacturers of Finland
Manufacturing companies established in 1928
Manufacturing companies disestablished in 1951
1928 establishments in Finland
1951 disestablishments in Finland